FHM was the Australian edition of the British monthly men's lifestyle magazine called FHM. The magazine was published between April 1998 and May 2012 in Australia.

History and profile
FHM Australia was first published in April 1998. The founding company was EMAP Australia. The magazine was part of and published by ACP Magazines. The company acquired EMAP Australia in 2008. The headquarters was in Sydney. Guy Mosel served as the editor-in-chief of the magazine, which was published on a monthly basis.

In 2006, Lauryn Eagle won the FHM Lara Croft Challenge involved physical challenges of shooting, running, ropes, ladders, 4-wheel driving and swimming. FHM Australia  went defunct with its May 2012 issue.

FHM 100 Sexiest Women in the World
Each of FHM's international editions publish yearly rankings for the sexiest women alive based on public and editorial voting through the magazine's website. Dates of magazine issues, winners, ages of winners at the time of selection, and pertinent comments are listed below for the Australian edition.

References

1998 establishments in Australia
2012 disestablishments in Australia
ACP magazine titles
Men's magazines published in Australia
Monthly magazines published in Australia
Defunct magazines published in Australia
Magazines established in 1998
Magazines disestablished in 2012
Magazines published in Sydney
Men's fashion magazines